Kenny (also known as The Kid Brother) is a 1988 film featuring Kenny Easterday in a semi-autobiographical role.

Plot
The film follows how 13-year-old Kenny, his family and neighborhood deal with the intrusion of a French-speaking Quebec crew filming a documentary about Kenny's adaptation to his unusual congenital condition, the absence of his pelvis and legs. It was filmed in the Pittsburgh suburb of West Aliquippa, Pennsylvania, United States.

Cast
Kenny Easterday as Kenny
Caitlin Clarke as Sharon
Liane Curtis as Sharon Kay
Zach Grenier as Jesse
Jesse Easterday, Jr. as Eddy
Bingo O'Malley as Mr. Nilan

Awards and nominations
Kenny won the Special Jury Prize at the Paris Film Festival (1988), Grand Prix des Amériques at the Montreal World Film Festival (1987), and UNICEF Award - Honorable Mention and C.I.F.E.J. Award at the Berlin International Film Festival (1988).

References

External links
 

1980s teen drama films
1988 films
American teen drama films
1980s English-language films
Films about amputees
Films about brothers
Films about children
Films about disability
Films about families
Films about runaways
Films about siblings
Films set in Pittsburgh
Films directed by Claude Gagnon
1980s American films